The Sanvitale conspiracy was a plot to assassinate Ranuccio I Farnese, Duke of Parma and Piacenza, and members of his family at the baptism of his new-born son Alessandro in 1611.

The plot was exposed and the conspirators were arrested and tortured. The gran giustizia brought immediate advantages to the Farnese, who were at the same time rid of troublesome rivals and enriched by the appropriation of their money and lands. However many, including some in powerful foreign courts, believed that the plot had been entirely fabricated by Ranuccio for exactly these purposes. Ranuccio's reputation was seriously and permanently damaged. The question of whether the plot was real or a fabrication is still open.

Background

The Sanvitale conspiracy was the third plot against the Farnese family in the space of seventy years. The first was the successful conspiracy, supported or instigated by Ferrante Gonzaga, of Giovanni Francesco Anguissola, Gianluigi Confalonieri, Agostino Landi and Alessandro, Camillo and Gerolamo Pallavicino to assassinate Pier Luigi Farnese, who was stabbed to death by Anguissola and two hired killers in Piacenza on 10 September 1547. The second was the failed conspiracy of Claudio Landi, Prince of Val di Taro, with Giambattista Anguissola and Giammaria and Cammillo Scotti to assassinate Ottavio Farnese, Duke of Parma in 1582, following which Landi lost the Val di Taro to the Farnese, and the other conspirators lost their heads.

Barbara Sanseverino was heiress to the fief of Colorno, which her ancestor Roberto Sanseverino, Conte di Caiazzo had received from Francesco Sforza in 1458. She had married on 6 September 1564, in her fifteenth year, Giberto IV Sanvitale, Duca di Sala, and following his death in 1585 had obtained from Ottavio Farnese a decree that allowed her to pass Colorno to their only son Girolamo Sanvitale. In the early 1600s this was contested by Ranuccio Farnese on the grounds that the fief could not pass by maternal succession. He claimed Colorno, and sent troops to occupy it.

References

1611 in Italy
Conspiracies
Failed assassination attempts in Europe
1611 crimes in Europe
Duchy of Parma